Marcel Dumont (real name Marcel Félix Georges Dumont) (8 June 1885 – 10 February 1951) was a French film director.

Filmography 
 1920 : Irène
 1920 : Au-delà des lois humaines
 1921 : La Proie
 1921 : Les Élus de la Mer with Gaston Roudès
 1923 : Le Juge d'instruction
 1925 : L'Éveil with Gaston Roudès
 1925 : Les élus de la mer
 1927 : Le Dédale with Gaston Roudès
 1929 : La maison des hommes vivants
 1932 : L'Affaire de la rue de Lourcine with Serjius

References

External links 
 

Silent film directors
Film directors from Paris
1885 births
1951 deaths